This is the List of palaces and manor houses in Estonia. This list does not include castles, which are listed in a separate article. As there are at least 400 manor houses in Estonia, this list is incomplete.

Palaces and manor houses in Estonia

See also
Baltic nobility
Baltic Germans
List of palaces and manor houses in Latvia
List of palaces and manor houses in Lithuania
List of castles
List of castles in Estonia
List of castles in Latvia
List of castles in Lithuania
List of summer manors in Estonia

Additional information

References

Sources

External links

 Estonian Manors Portal
 Estonian Manor Association
 Manor Houses & Castles at VisitEstonia

Palaces and manor houses
 
 
Estonia
Palaces and manor houses